The 2018–19 Memphis Grizzlies season was the 24th season of the franchise in the NBA and its 18th in Memphis.

On May 1, 2018, the Grizzlies named former interim coach J. B. Bickerstaff as the official head coach. On February 7, 2019, Marc Gasol was traded to the Toronto Raptors, after spending 11 years with the Grizzlies (his entire NBA career up until then). This was the first time since the  that Gasol was not on the team. They improved their record from the previous season, but still ended with a losing record and missing the playoffs. On June 19, 2019,  Mike Conley was traded to the Utah Jazz, ending his 12 year stint with the Grizzlies (his entire career up until that point).

Draft

Roster

<noinclude>

Standings

Division

Conference

Game log

Preseason 

|- style="background:#fcc;"
| 1
| October 2
| @ Houston
| 
| Mike Conley Jr. (16)
| JaMychal Green (8)
| Marc Gasol (4)
| Legacy Arena16,888
| 0–1
|- style="background:#cfc;"
| 2
| October 5
| Atlanta
| 
| Marc Gasol (21)
| JaMychal Green (9)
| Conley Jr., Gasol, Green, Parsons, Selden (3)
| FedExForum10,492
| 1–1
|- style="background:#cfc;"
| 3
| October 6
| Indiana
| 
| Jaren Jackson Jr. (18)
| Ivan Rabb (12)
| Wayne Selden (9)
| FedExForum11,615
| 2–1
|- style="background:#fcc;"
| 4
| October 10
| @ Orlando
| 
| Mike Conley Jr. (24)
| Marc Gasol (9)
| Marc Gasol (5)
| Amway Center14,299
| 2–2
|- style="background:#fcc;"
| 5
| October 12
| Houston
| 
| Jaren Jackson Jr. (18)
| Marc Gasol (9)
| Mike Conley Jr. (6)
| FedExForum12,576
| 2–3

Regular season 

|- style="background:#fcc;"
| 1
| October 17
| @ Indiana
| 
| Marc Gasol (13)
| Marc Gasol (6)
| Gasol, Jackson Jr., Mack (3)
| Bankers Life Fieldhouse17,923
| 0–1
|- style="background:#cfc;"
| 2
| October 19
| Atlanta
| 
| Garrett Temple (30)
| Gasol, Jackson Jr. (7)
| Mike Conley Jr. (11)
| FedExForum17,019
| 1–1
|- style="background:#cfc;"
| 3
| October 22
| @ Utah
| 
| Mike Conley Jr. (23)
| Marc Gasol (13)
| Conley Jr., Gasol (4)
| Vivint Smart Home Arena18,306
| 2–1
|-style="background:#fcc;"
| 4
| October 24
| @ Sacramento
| 
| Mike Conley Jr. (27)
| Marc Gasol (10)
| Mike Conley Jr. (5)
| Golden 1 Center14,198
| 2–2
|-style="background:#cfc;"
| 5
| October 27
| Phoenix
| 
| Marc Gasol (19)
| Marc Gasol (8)
| Mike Conley Jr. (7)
| FedExForum15,926
| 3–2
|- style="background:#cfc;"
| 6
| October 30
| Washington
| 
| Garrett Temple (20)
| Kyle Anderson (11)
| Shelvin Mack (8)
| FedExForum14,106
| 4–2

|- style="background:#cfc;"
| 7
| November 2
| @ Utah
| 
| Mike Conley Jr. (28)
| Marc Gasol (10)
| Marc Gasol (7)
| Vivint Smart Home Arena18,306
| 5–2
|- style="background:#fcc;"
| 8
| November 4
| @ Phoenix
| 
| Shelvin Mack (21)
| Marc Gasol (8)
| Mike Conley Jr. (5)
| Talking Stick Resort Arena13,074
| 5–3
|- style="background:#fcc;"
| 9
| November 5
| @ Golden State
| 
| Dillon Brooks (18)
| Marc Gasol (10)
| Marc Gasol (9)
| Oracle Arena19,596
| 5–4
|- style="background:#cfc"
| 10
| November 7
| Denver
| 
| Gasol, Jackson Jr. (20)
| Marc Gasol (12)
| Mike Conley Jr. (8)
| FedExForum15,832
| 6–4
|-style="background:#cfc"
| 11
| November 10
| Philadelphia
| 
| Mike Conley Jr. (32)
| Kyle Anderson (13)
| Conley Jr., Gasol (6)
| FedExForum16,904
| 7–4　
|- style="background:#fcc;"
| 12
| November 12
| Utah
| 
| Mike Conley Jr. (24)
| Kyle Anderson (13)
| Kyle Anderson (5)
| FedExForum13,477
| 7–5
|- style="background:#cfc;"
| 13
| November 14
| @ Milwaukee
| 
| Marc Gasol (29)
| Kyle Anderson (8)
| Shelvin Mack (5)
| Fiserv Forum16,817
| 8–5
|- style="background:#cfc;
| 14
| November 16
| Sacramento
| 
| Jaren Jackson Jr. (27)
| Marc Gasol (15)
| Shelvin Mack (8)
| FedExForum13,811
| 9–5
|- style="background:#cfc;"
| 15
| November 18
| @ Minnesota
| 
| Marc Gasol (26)
| Marc Gasol (13)
| Mike Conley Jr. (8)
| Target Center13,179
| 10–5
|-style="background:#cfc;"
| 16
| November 19
| Dallas
| 
| Mike Conley Jr. (28)
| Marc Gasol (15)
| Mike Conley Jr. (7)
| FedExForum15,997
| 11–5
|-style="background:#cfc;"
| 17
| November 21
| @ San Antonio
| 
| Mike Conley Jr. (30)
| Marc Gasol (10)
| Mike Conley Jr. (9)
| AT&T Center18,354
| 12–5
|-style="background:#fcc;"
| 18
| November 23
| @ LA Clippers
| 
| Marc Gasol (27)
| Marc Gasol (13)
| Mike Conley Jr. (11)
| Staples Center15,418
| 12–6
|-style="background:#fcc;"
| 19
| November 25
| NY Knicks
| 
| Marc Gasol (27)
| Marc Gasol (8)
| Mike Conley Jr. (11)
| FedExForum14,331
| 12–7
|-style="background:#fcc;"
| 20
| November 27
| Toronto
| 
| Marc Gasol (27)
| JaMychal Green (7)
| Mike Conley Jr. (6)
| FedExForum14,187
| 12–8
|- style="background:#cfc;"
| 21
| November 30
| @ Brooklyn
| 
| Mike Conley Jr. (37)
| Marc Gasol (15)
| Mike Conley Jr. (10)
| Barclays Center12,983
| 13–8

|- style="background:#fcc;"
| 22
| December 2
| @ Philadelphia
| 
| Mike Conley Jr. (21)
| Omri Casspi (8)
| Conley Jr., Anderson (5)
| Wells Fargo Center20,334
| 13–9
|- style="background:#cfc;"
| 23
| December 5
| LA Clippers
| 
| Mike Conley Jr. (22)
| JaMychal Green (11)
| Kyle Anderson (6)
| FedExForum14,144
| 14–9
|- style="background:#cfc;"
| 24
| December 7
| @ New Orleans
| 
| JaMychal Green (23)
| Kyle Anderson (11)
| Mike Conley Jr. (10)
| Smoothie King Center18,447
| 15–9
|- style="background:#fcc;"
| 25
| December 8
| LA Lakers
| 
| Wayne Selden (17)
| Jaren Jackson Jr. (8)
| Anderson, Selden (4)
| FedExForum17,794
| 15–10
|- style="background:#fcc;"
| 26
| December 10
| @ Denver
| 
| Mike Conley Jr. (19)
| JaMychal Green (10)
| Conley Jr., Gasol (6)
| Pepsi Center15,278
| 15–11
|- style="background:#cfc;"
| 27
| December 12
| Portland
| 
| Mike Conley Jr. (23)
| Kyle Anderson (12)
| Mike Conley Jr. (6)
| FedExForum16,282
| 16–11
|- style="background:#fcc;"
| 28
| December 14
| Miami
| 
| Mike Conley Jr. (22)
| Marc Gasol (8)
| Mike Conley Jr. (8)
| FedExForum16,313
| 16–12
|- style="background:#fcc;"
| 29
| December 15
| Houston
| 
| Mike Conley Jr. (22)
| Marc Gasol (9)
| Mike Conley Jr. (6)
| FedExForum16,777
| 16–13
|- style="background:#fcc;"
| 30
| December 17
| @ Golden State
| 
| Omri Casspi (20)
| Casspi, Gasol (6)
| Marc Gasol (6)
| Oracle Arena19,596
| 16–14
|- style="background:#fcc;"
| 31
| December 19
| @ Portland
| 
| Mike Conley Jr. (23)
| Marc Gasol (9)
| Mike Conley Jr. (6)
| Moda Center19,412
| 16–15
|- style="background:#fcc;"
| 32
| December 21
| @ Sacramento
| 
| Mike Conley Jr. (23)
| JaMychal Green (9)
| Conley Jr., Gasol (5)
| Golden 1 Center16,369
| 16–16
|- style="background:#cfc;"
| 33
| December 23
| @ LA Lakers
| 
| Jaren Jackson Jr. (27)
| Gasol, Jackson Jr. (9)
| Conley Jr., Gasol (8)
| Staples Center18,997
| 17–16
|- style="background:#cfc;"
| 34
| December 26
| Cleveland
| 
| Marc Gasol (20)
| Marc Gasol (9)
| Mike Conley (8)
| FedExForum16,424
| 18–16
|- style="background:#fcc;"
| 35
| December 29
| Boston
| 
| Mike Conley Jr. (26)
| JaMychal Green (9)
| Marc Gasol (10)
| FedExForum17,794
| 18–17
|- style="background:#fcc;"
| 36
| December 31
| @ Houston
| 
| Kyle Anderson (20)
| Marc Gasol (12)
| Anderson, Conley Jr. (5)
| Toyota Center18,055
| 18–18

|- style="background:#fcc;"
| 37
| January 2
| Detroit
| 
| Jaren Jackson Jr. (26)
| Jaren Jackson Jr. (10)
| Shelvin Mack (6)
| FedExForum14,109
| 18–19
|- style="background:#fcc;"
| 38
| January 4
| Brooklyn
| 
| Mike Conley Jr. (31)
| Kyle Anderson (11)
| Kyle Anderson (10)
| FedExForum16,683
| 18–20
|- style="background:#fcc;"
| 39
| January 5
| @ San Antonio
| 
| Mike Conley Jr. (21)
| Marc Gasol (11)
| Marc Gasol (6)
| AT&T Center18,354
| 18–21
|- style="background:#fcc;"
| 40
| January 7
| @ New Orleans
| 
| Mike Conley Jr. (22)
| Joakim Noah (8)
| Mike Conley Jr. (10)
| Smoothie King Center14,624
| 18–22
|- style="background:#cfc;"
| 41
| January 9
| San Antonio
| 
| Marc Gasol (26)
| Marc Gasol (14)
| Shelvin Mack (7)
| FedExForum13,944
| 19–22
|- style="background:#fcc;"
| 42
| January 12
| @ Miami
| 
| JaMychal Green (24)
| JaMychal Green (11)
| Mike Conley Jr. (7)
| American Airlines Arena19,600
| 19–23
|- style="background:#fcc;"
| 43
| January 14
| @ Houston
| 
| Temple, Conley (14)
| Gasol, Conley (7)
| Mike Conley Jr. (7)
| Toyota Center18,055
| 19–24
|- style="background:#fcc;"
| 44
| January 16
| Milwaukee
| 
| Omri Casspi (17)
| JaMychal Green (10)
| Shelvin Mack (6)
| FedExForum14,921
| 19–25
|- style="background:#fcc;"
| 45
| January 18
| @ Boston
| 
| Mike Conley Jr. (26)
| Marc Gasol (11)
| Marc Gasol (12)
| TD Garden18,624
| 19–26
|- style="background:#fcc;"
| 46
| January 19
| @ Toronto
| 
| Jaren Jackson Jr. (16)
| Ivan Rabb (11)
| Shelvin Mack (5)
| Scotiabank Arena19,800
| 19–27
|- style="background:#fcc;"
| 47
| January 21
| New Orleans
| 
| Marc Gasol (22)
| Marc Gasol (8)
| Mike Conley Jr. (8)
| FedExForum17,794
| 19–28
|- style="background:#fcc;"
| 48
| January 23
| Charlotte
| 
| Mike Conley Jr. (31)
| Marc Gasol (17)
| Marc Gasol (10)
| FedExForum12,863
| 19–29
|- style="background:#fcc;"
| 49
| January 25
| Sacramento
| 
| Omri Casspi (18)
| Marc Gasol (10)
| Mike Conley Jr. (9)
| FedExForum14,486
| 19–30
|- style="background:#cfc;"
| 50
| January 26
| Indiana
| 
| Mike Conley Jr. (22)
| Marc Gasol (7)
| Mike Conley Jr. (11)
| FedExForum14,486
| 20–30
|- style="background:#fcc;"
| 51
| January 28
| Denver
| 
| Marc Gasol (28)
| Marc Gasol (9)
| Mike Conley Jr. (7)
| FedExForum12,917
| 20–31
|- style="background:#fcc;"
| 52
| January 30
| @ Minnesota
| 
| Mike Conley Jr. (26)
| Ivan Rabb (10)
| Mike Conley Jr. (8)
| Target Center13,615
| 20–32

|- style="background:#fcc;"
| 53
| February 1
| @ Charlotte
| 
| Shelvin Mack (19)
| Joakim Noah (11)
| Shelvin Mack (9)
| Spectrum Center15,387
| 20–33
|- style="background:#cfc;"
| 54
| February 3
| @ N. Y. Knicks
| 
| Mike Conley Jr. (25)
| Marc Gasol (9)
| Mike Conley Jr. (7)
| Madison Square Garden17,025
| 21–33
|- style="background:#cfc;"
| 55
| February 5
| Minnesota
| 
| Mike Conley Jr. (25)
| Ivan Rabb (11)
| Mike Conley Jr. (9)
| FedExForum13,454
| 22–33
|- style="background:#fcc;"
| 56
| February 7
| @ Oklahoma City
| 
| Jaren Jackson Jr. (27)
| Ivan Rabb (9)
| Mike Conley Jr. (7)
| Chesapeake Energy Arena18,203
| 22–34
|- style="background:#cfc;"
| 57
| February 9
| New Orleans
| 
| Joakim Noah (19)
| Joakim Noah (14)
| Mike Conley Jr. (9)
| FedExForum16,841
| 23–34
|- style="background:#fcc;"
| 58
| February 12
| San Antonio
| 
| Avery Bradley (33)
| Jonas Valanciunas (10)
| Bradley, Wright (6)
| FedExForum13,788
| 23–35
|- style="background:#fcc;"
| 59
| February 13
| @ Chicago
| 
| Avery Bradley (15)
| Jonas Valanciunas (7)
| Bradley, Conley Jr., Valanciunas, Wright (5)
| United Center19,114
| 23–36
|- style="background:#fcc;"
| 60
| February 22
| L. A. Clippers
| 
| Mike Conley Jr. (25)
| Joakim Noah (11)
| Mike Conley Jr. (10)
| FedExForum16,444
| 23–37
|- style="background:#fcc;"
| 61
| February 23
| @ Cleveland
| 
| Jonas Valanciunas (25)
| Jonas Valanciunas (11)
| Noah, Rabb (4)
| Quicken Loans Arena19,432
| 23–38
|- style="background:#cfc;"
| 62
| February 25
| L. A. Lakers
| 
| Mike Conley Jr. (30)
| Jonas Valanciunas (13)
| Mike Conley Jr. (5)
| FedExForum17,794
| 24–38
|- style="background:#fcc;"
| 63
| February 27
| Chicago
| 
| Avery Bradley (23)
| Joakim Noah (9)
| Avery Bradley (7)
| FedExForum13,711
| 24–39

|- style="background:#cfc;"
| 64
| March 2
| @ Dallas
| 
| Jonas Valanciunas (20)
| Bruno Caboclo (11)
| Bruno Caboclo (6)
| American Airlines Center20,233
| 25–39
|- style="background:#fcc;"
| 65
| March 3
| @ Oklahoma City
| 
| Avery Bradley (27)
| Jonas Valanciunas (13)
| Avery Bradley (7)
| Chesapeake Energy Arena18,203
| 25–40
|- style="background:#cfc;"
| 66
| March 5
| Portland
| 
| Mike Conley Jr. (30)
| Joakim Noah (10)
| Joakim Noah (7)
| FedExForum13,801
| 26–40
|- style="background:#cfc;"
| 67
| March 8
| Utah
| 
| Mike Conley Jr. (28)
| Joakim Noah (11)
| Mike Conley Jr. (8)
| FedExForum15,407
| 27–40
|- style="background:#cfc;"
| 68
| March 10
| Orlando
| 
| Mike Conley Jr. (26)
| Jonas Valanciunas (8)
| Mike Conley Jr. (8)
| FedExForum16,627
| 28–40
|- style="background:#fcc;"
| 69
| March 13
| @ Atlanta
| 
| Mike Conley Jr. (20)
| Joakim Noah (8)
| Mike Conley Jr. (7)
| State Farm Arena15,169
| 28–41
|- style="background:#fcc;"
| 70
| March 16
| @ Washington
| 
| Mike Conley Jr. (28)
| Jonas Valanciunas (8)
| Mike Conley Jr. (12)
| Capital One Arena19,750
| 28–42
|- style="background:#cfc;"
| 71
| March 20
| Houston
| 
| Mike Conley Jr. (35)
| Jonas Valanciunas (15)
| Mike Conley Jr. (8)
| FedExForum16,691
| 29–42
|- style="background:#fcc;"
| 72
| March 22
| @ Orlando
| 
| Tyler Dorsey (29)
| Jonas Valanciunas (24)
| Tyler Dorsey (9)
| Amway Center18,025
| 29–43
|- style="background:#fcc;"
| 73
| March 23
| Minnesota
| 
| Mike Conley Jr. (23)
| Jonas Valanciunas (14)
| Delon Wright (6)
| FedExForum16,977
| 29–44
|- style="background:#cfc;"
| 74
| March 25
| Oklahoma City
| 
| Bruno Caboclo (24)
| Jonas Valanciunas (14)
| Delon Wright (13)
| FedExForum15,144
| 30–44
|- style="background:#fcc;"
| 75
| March 27
| Golden State
| 
| Jonas Valanciunas (27)
| Valanciunas, Caboclo (13)
| Mike Conley Jr. (8)
| FedExForum17,794
| 30–45
|- style="background:#cfc;"
| 76
| March 30
| @ Phoenix
| 
| Mike Conley Jr. (33)
| Jonas Valanciunas (20)
| Conley Jr., Valanciunas, Dorsey (5)
| Talking Stick Resort Arena16,647
| 31–45
|- style="background:#fcc;"
| 77
| March 31
| @ L. A. Clippers
| 
| Delon Wright (20)
| Delon Wright (8)
| Delon Wright (4)
| Staples Center16,740
| 31–46

|- style="background:#fcc;"
| 78
| April 3
| @ Portland
| 
| Chandler Parsons (16)
| Ivan Rabb (10)
| Delon Wright (6)
| Moda Center19,608
| 31–47
|- style="background:#cfc;"
| 79
| April 5
| @ Dallas
| 
| Delon Wright (26)
| Delon Wright (10)
| Delon Wright (14)
| American Airlines Center20,111
| 32–47
|- style="background:#fcc;"
| 80
| April 7
| Dallas
| 
| Justin Holiday (30)
| Bruno Caboclo (17)
| Delon Wright (12)
| FedExForum16,744
| 32–48
|- style="background:#fcc;"
| 81
| April 9
| @ Detroit
| 
| Caboclo, Wright (15)
| Ivan Rabb (10)
| Zeller, Dorsey (3)
| Little Caesars Arena19,802
| 32–49
|- style="background:#cfc;"
| 82
| April 10
| Golden State
| 
| Jevon Carter (32)
| Delon Wright (11)
| Delon Wright (11)
| FedExForum17,794
| 33–49

Player statistics

|-
| align="left"| || align="center"| SF
| 43 || 40 || 1,281 || 251 || 128 || 54 || 37 || 346
|-
| align="left"|≠ || align="center"| SG
| 14 || 14 || 442 || 44 || 56 || 14 || 0 || 225
|-
| align="left"| || align="center"| SF
| 18 || 0 || 330 || 31 || 16 || 10 || 4 || 135
|-
| align="left"|† || align="center"| SG
| 29 || 0 || 387 || 45 || 25 || 9 || 4 || 190
|-
| align="left"| || align="center"| SF
| 34 || 19 || 800 || 158 || 50 || 14 || 33 || 282
|-
| align="left"| || align="center"| PG
| 39 || 3 || 577 || 66 || 69 || 26 || 11 || 172
|-
| align="left"|‡ || align="center"| SF
| 36 || 0 || 520 || 115 || 26 || 20 || 9 || 226
|-
| align="left"| || align="center"| PG
| style=";"|70 || style=";"|70 || style=";"|2,342 || 239 || style=";"|449 || style=";"|94 || 22 || style=";"|1,478
|-
| align="left"|≠ || align="center"| SG
| 21 || 11 || 447 || 70 || 39 || 7 || 1 || 206
|-
| align="left"|† || align="center"| C
| 53 || 53 || 1,788 || style=";"|455 || 248 || 60 || 63 || 834
|-
| align="left"|† || align="center"| PF
| 41 || 4 || 900 || 252 || 36 || 33 || 26 || 403
|-
| align="left"|‡ || align="center"| SG
| 2 || 0 || 26 || 1 || 5 || 1 || 0 || 8
|-
| align="left"|‡ || align="center"| PG
| 1 || 0 || 5 || 0 || 0 || 0 || 0 || 2
|-
| align="left"|≠ || align="center"| SG
| 44 || 39 || 1,282 || 154 || 61 || 54 || 15 || 417
|-
| align="left"| || align="center"| PF
| 58 || 56 || 1,515 || 272 || 64 || 52 || style=";"|82 || 798
|-
| align="left"|† || align="center"| PG
| 53 || 3 || 1,204 || 102 || 182 || 45 || 4 || 421
|-
| align="left"|≠ || align="center"| SF
| 13 || 0 || 294 || 27 || 14 || 8 || 5 || 121
|-
| align="left"| || align="center"| C
| 42 || 1 || 693 || 238 || 89 || 20 || 31 || 298
|-
| align="left"| || align="center"| SF
| 25 || 3 || 496 || 70 || 43 || 19 || 5 || 187
|-
| align="left"| || align="center"| PF
| 49 || 13 || 721 || 206 || 54 || 17 || 14 || 284
|-
| align="left"|† || align="center"| SG
| 32 || 0 || 455 || 44 || 36 || 10 || 6 || 172
|-
| align="left"|‡ || align="center"| SG
| 1 || 0 || 7 || 0 || 0 || 1 || 0 || 2
|-
| align="left"|† || align="center"| SG
| 49 || 49 || 1,530 || 152 || 69 || 50 || 25 || 463
|-
| align="left"|≠ || align="center"| C
| 19 || 17 || 527 || 203 || 41 || 6 || 30 || 379
|-
| align="left"| || align="center"| SF
| 18 || 3 || 254 || 41 || 14 || 13 || 2 || 40
|-
| align="left"| || align="center"| SF
| 15 || 0 || 174 || 31 || 8 || 4 || 1 || 39
|-
| align="left"|≠ || align="center"| PG
| 26 || 11 || 802 || 141 || 138 || 42 || 15 || 316
|-
| align="left"| || align="center"| C
| 4 || 1 || 82 || 18 || 3 || 1 || 3 || 46
|}
After all games.
‡Waived during the season
†Traded during the season
≠Acquired during the season

Transactions

Trades

Free agency

Additions

Subtractions

References

Memphis Grizzlies seasons
Memphis Grizzlies
Memphis Grizzlies
Memphis Grizzlies
Events in Memphis, Tennessee